Omarama is a small town (population 291 at 2018 census) at the junction of State Highways 8 and 83, near the southern end of the Mackenzie Basin, in the South Island of New Zealand. Omarama is in the Waitaki District, in the southern Canterbury region. The Ahuriri River is a short distance to the north of the township. Omarama is 30 km (20 minutes drive) southwest of Twizel, 40 km (30 minutes drive) southeast of Lake Ōhau and 32 km (21 minutes drive) northeast of the Lindis Pass.

Omarama is primarily a rural service centre, providing local farmers and other residents with necessities and facilities such as grocery shopping, fuel and mechanical services, as well as a post shop.

In more recent years these and similar services have expanded moderately, due to the increase in new residents and visitors, including anglers, artists, astronomers, sailplane enthusiasts, skiers and general tourists.

A significant proportion of permanent village residents are employees of, or contractors to, Meridian Energy Limited, a state-owned enterprise which is responsible for the nearby dams and powerstations that are part of New Zealand's hydroelectricity generation.

Ōmarama is Māori for "Place of Light", a reference to its extraordinarily pure and clear sky.

Demographics
It is part of the larger Aviemore statistical area.

Omarama had a population of 291 at the 2018 New Zealand census, an increase of 21 people (7.8%) since the 2013 census, and an increase of 60 people (26.0%) since the 2006 census. There were 111 households. There were 147 males and 144 females, giving a sex ratio of 1.02 males per female, with 27 people (9.3%) aged under 15 years, 54 (18.6%) aged 15 to 29, 147 (50.5%) aged 30 to 64, and 66 (22.7%) aged 65 or older.

Ethnicities were 78.4% European/Pākehā, 4.1% Māori, 14.4% Asian, and 4.1% other ethnicities (totals add to more than 100% since people could identify with multiple ethnicities).

Although some people objected to giving their religion, 54.6% had no religion, 30.9% were Christian, 2.1% were Hindu, 1.0% were Buddhist and 1.0% had other religions.

Of those at least 15 years old, 39 (14.8%) people had a bachelor or higher degree, and 42 (15.9%) people had no formal qualifications. The employment status of those at least 15 was that 159 (60.2%) people were employed full-time, and 42 (15.9%) were part-time.

Aviemore statistical area

Aviemore had a population of 765 at the 2018 New Zealand census, an increase of 63 people (9.0%) since the 2013 census, and an increase of 96 people (14.3%) since the 2006 census. There were 324 households. There were 411 males and 357 females, giving a sex ratio of 1.15 males per female. The median age was 46.0 years (compared with 37.4 years nationally), with 99 people (12.9%) aged under 15 years, 138 (18.0%) aged 15 to 29, 360 (47.1%) aged 30 to 64, and 168 (22.0%) aged 65 or older.

Ethnicities were 86.7% European/Pākehā, 5.5% Māori, 0.8% Pacific peoples, 8.6% Asian, and 3.1% other ethnicities (totals add to more than 100% since people could identify with multiple ethnicities).

The proportion of people born overseas was 20.8%, compared with 27.1% nationally.

Although some people objected to giving their religion, 53.7% had no religion, 36.9% were Christian, 2.0% were Hindu, 1.2% were Buddhist and 0.8% had other religions.

Of those at least 15 years old, 90 (13.5%) people had a bachelor or higher degree, and 105 (15.8%) people had no formal qualifications. The median income was $34,700, compared with $31,800 nationally. 93 people (14.0%) earned over $70,000 compared to 17.2% nationally. The employment status of those at least 15 was that 411 (61.7%) people were employed full-time, 93 (14.0%) were part-time, and 3 (0.5%) were unemployed.

History 
The first European to visit Omarama was Walter Mantell in December 1852. European settlement began in 1857 with the establishment of the Benmore and Ben Ohau stations.

Ōmārama was an important food source (kāinga mahinga kai) for the Ngāi Tahu in the  Mackenzie Basin. In 1877, Hipa Te Maiharoa with over 100 supporters travelled up the Waitaki River to Omarama  and camped at Ōmārama to reaffirm the Ngāi Tahu claim to the interior of the South Island. This led to numerous visits from the government and Ngāi Tahu leaders to Omarama.  In 1879, they were evicted by an armed constabulary. Te Maiharoa and his followers then  moved to the mouth of the Waitaki River.

Agriculture

Although traditionally sheep country, Omarama area farms, along with those within the rest of the Mackenzie Basin, have rapidly converted to predominantly dairy farming, due to falling sheep meat and wool prices, and the recent boom in dairy product earnings.

The dairy conversion has made major changes to the local environment, with iconic tussock lands being ploughed and replaced by pasture, facilitated by new irrigation schemes. Large centre pivot irrigators and private canal networks now dominate much of the landscape.

Recently however, diminishing returns on dairy-based agriculture have led to farmers investigating alternative methods and practices, some now experimenting with biofuel crops.

Angling 

There are many rivers and lakes in and near Omarama suitable for recreational fishing. The nearby Ahuriri River is a noted fly-fishing river and adjacent Lake Benmore and Lake Ōhau are popular with boaters, as well as fly casters and other anglers.

Commonly encountered local fish species include salmon, and brown and rainbow trout.

Astronomy 

Omarama is home of the annual mid winter star party. Local street lighting and other light sources are dimmed or switched off for the duration of the event.

Benmore Peak Observatory is located approximately 13 km north of Omarama, atop the nearby Benmore Range.

Gliding 

Due to the strong gliding conditions in the Omarama area, and Mackenzie Basin, it is known as a world-class gliding location, gaining fame among sailplane pilots around the world after hosting the 1995 World Gliding Championships.

Pilots come to Omarama to experience strong lee wave conditions, ridge soaring and thermal flying.  It is common for Omarama-based gliders to soar hundreds of kilometers along the Southern Alps each day. In ideal conditions, it is possible for gliders to reach distances in excess of 2000 km.  Several national and world gliding records have been achieved from Omarama, and the prevailing conditions have attracted record seekers such as Steve Fossett.

The Omarama Gliding Club and several commercial gliding organizations are based in the town.

Snow sports 

There are three skifields within the MacKenzie Basin; Ohau, Round Hill, and Mount Dobson.

Hot tubs 
A local business provides outdoor hot tubs on a private landscaped site, along with saunas and massage.

Mountain biking 
Omarama is on the route of the Alps to Ocean Cycle Trail, after the trail was constructed following approval in 2010.

Other attractions 
Omarama is a popular holiday destination amongst those living in surrounding districts and provinces, many owning family holiday residences within the village. Tramping is also popular with locals and visitors alike, due to the spectacular and often rugged landscape. Due to the spectacular scenery, numerous artists regularly visit the Omarama area, and several are now permanent residents, exhibiting their Omarama and Mackenzie landscapes and other work in local galleries and further afield.

Education 
Omarama School was first built on Buscot Station in the 1930s. It was moved to its present site on State Highway 8 in Omarama during the 1940s.  As a result of people moving to work at the local hydro electricity development, Omarama School increased in size to a four-teacher school in the late 1980s. Today,  2.5 FTE of teachers teach at the school and its catchment area  serves Omarama and a wide area of the Upper Waitaki high country. Omarama School caters for new entrants to Year 8 children with two classrooms, a school library and a covered solar heated pool on a 11938 square metre site. Omarama School has a roll of  students as of

Government 
Omarama is part of the Waitaki Electorate. The Waitaki District Council provide local government services to Omarama. In 2020, the Waitaki District Council published a masterplan for developing Omarama.

In popular culture
In his novel The Zombie Survival Guide, Max Brooks of World War Z fame makes reference to Omarama as site of a historical zombie attack.

Disney's movie Mulan released in 2020 was partially filmed at the Omarama Clay Cliffs.

References

External links

 Omarama Gliding Club 
 Omarama News and Events – Omarama Gazette
 Gliding World altitude record attempt
 Discover Omarama
 Benmore Peak Observatory

Waitaki District
Populated places in Canterbury, New Zealand